Minuscule 152 (in the Gregory-Aland numbering), ε 303 (Soden), is a Greek minuscule manuscript of the New Testament, on parchment leaves. Palaeographically it has been assigned to the 13th century. It has complex contents, and full marginalia.

Description 

The codex contains a complete text of the four Gospels on 315 parchment leaves (size ). The text is written in one column per page, in 20 lines per page. The ink is brown-black, the initial letters in blue.

It has no prolegomena.

The text of John's ending on 21:24, and verse 25 were added by a later hand.

Text 

It is similar to the codex 16. Aland did not place it in any Category.
According to the Claremont Profile Method in Luke 1; 10; and 20 it belongs to the group 1216 and creates a pair with 555.

History 
It is dated by the INTF to the 13th century.

The manuscript was examined by Birch (about 1782) and Scholz. C. R. Gregory saw the manuscript in 1886.

It is currently housed at the Vatican Library (Pal. gr. 227), at Rome.

See also 

 List of New Testament minuscules
 Biblical manuscript
 Textual criticism

References

Further reading

External links 
 

Greek New Testament minuscules
13th-century biblical manuscripts
Manuscripts of the Vatican Library